Virtua Our Lady of Lourdes Hospital is a teaching hospital in Camden, New Jersey which opened on July 1, 1950.

Services
The hospital is one of the largest providers of cardiology services in the Delaware Valley. The cardiologists specialize in angioplasty and stent placement; open heart surgery and valve replacement; electrophysiology; heart failure management; cardiac rehabilitation; and enhanced external counterpulsation, or EECP, for treatment of chest pain. In 2007, Lourdes began employing cool, pulsed laser technology to clear blockages in blood vessels of patients with peripheral vascular disease.

The hospital is a state-designated Regional Perinatal Center, meaning it is equipped to handle high-risk pregnancies as well as providing typical midwifery. Its intensive care nursery is equipped to care for babies that are born at less than 32 weeks gestation.

It began providing dialysis services in 1969 and began its organ transplantation program in 1974. It is the only hospital in New Jersey approved to perform kidney, pancreas and liver transplants.

The Lourdes Regional Rehabilitation Center provides rehabilitation services to in- and outpatients recovering from strokes, brain injuries, neurological disorders or multiple traumas and helps them relearn how to walk, bathe or climb steps, as well as regain speech and cognitive skills. Lourdes is a state-certified Primary Stroke Center for rapid and effective treatment of stroke patients, from initial diagnosis to rehabilitation.

Lourdes provides surgical services. In 2006, the hospital began offering robotic surgery as an option in performing minimally invasive urological and gynecologic procedures. Lourdes is designated as a Bariatric Center of Excellence for its weight loss surgery program.

References

Hospitals in New Jersey
Buildings and structures in Camden, New Jersey
Hospital buildings completed in 1950
1950 establishments in New Jersey